The 1916–17 Yale Bulldogs men's ice hockey season was the 22nd season of play for the program.

Season
On December 13, Yale announced Fred Rocque as their head coach. While the Bulldogs had coaches in years past, Rocque is cited as the first official coach in team history. Rocque, who had previously coached Dartmouth, substituted his player much more than the team had previously and would commonly have players perform at multiple positions in the same game. This tactic helped prevent the Elis from flagging at the end of games, something they had trouble with in recent years.

Yale had their best season in 18 years, posting a .714 winning percentage in 14 games. More importantly, the Elis won the season series against Harvard for the first time since 1908. The Bulldogs two overtime losses to Princeton cost them, however, as the series loss left all three teams in a three-way tie in the IHL and prevented any team from claiming the Intercollegiate Championship for 1917.

After the season the United States officially entered World War I. While most programs were suspended as a result, Yale's men's team would attempt to muddle through the season.

Roster

Standings

Schedule and Results

|-
!colspan=12 style="color:white; background:#00356B" | Regular Season

References

Yale Bulldogs men's ice hockey seasons
Yale
Yale
Yale
Yale